Vittore Zanetti Zilla (1864–1946) was an Italian painter.

Biography
Zilla was born in Venice, where he attended a technical school and at the same time began to approach painting by frequenting the studio of Giacomo Favretto, a family friend. After obtaining his secondary school leaving certificate in 1882, he decided to learn the rudiments of art under the guidance of Egisto Lancerotto. In 1884 he left to do his military service in Naples and Sicily, subsequently he returned to Venice and then moved with his family to the Abruzzo for several years, where he worked as a teacher. However, he continued his artistic research and in 1898 he started out on a journey through Europe, developing close contacts above all with the French landscapists. He took part in the Esposizioni Internazionali d’Arte di Venezia from the first edition in 1895 onwards (with a one-man show in 1914), making a name for himself with his lagoonscapes characterised by their decorative style not devoid of French influences. He experimented with watercolour and varnished tempera, which enabled him to obtain bright pure colours. He also participated in international exhibitions including the one in Munich in 1893 and the one in Buenos Aires in 1910. After the Caporetto defeat during World War I, he fled to Milan where he was to live in the years to follow. He organized two one-man shows at the Galleria Pesaro, in 1918 and 1920.  He died in Milan.

References
 Laura Casone, Vittore Zanetti Zilla, online catalogue Artgate by Fondazione Cariplo, 2010, CC BY-SA (source for the first revision of this article).

Other projects

19th-century Italian painters
Italian male painters
20th-century Italian painters
20th-century Italian male artists
1864 births
1946 deaths
Painters from Venice
Italian landscape painters
19th-century Italian male artists